Sumu-Epuh (reigned  Middle chronology) is the first attested king of Yamhad (Halab). He founded the Yamhad dynasty which controlled northern Syria throughout the 17th and 18th centuries BC.

Reign
Although Sumu-Epuh's early life or the way he ascended the throne is not known, he is considered the first king of Yamhad, and his realm included Alalakh and Tuba. Sumu-Epuh entered the historical records when he was mentioned by Yahdun-Lim of Mari, as one of the leaders who fought against him. Yahdun-Lim was an ambitious ruler who campaigned in the north claiming to have reached the Mediterranean, in spite of having a dynastic alliance with Yamhad to oppose Assyria. Those campaigns caused Sumu-Epuh to support the Yaminite tribes centered at Tuttul against the Mariote king, who emerged victorious but was soon killed by his own son. Yahdun-Lim's death was followed by Shamshi-Adad I of Assyria's conquest of Mari.

War Against Assyria
Sumu-Epuh aided by Khashshum attacked a kingdom in Zalmakum (a marshy region between the Euphrates and lower Balikh). Khashshum later shifted alliance and joined Shamshi-Adad, who surrounded Yamhad by alliances with the city of Urshu and king Aplahanda of Charchemish in the north, and by conquering Mari in the east (after the death of Yahdun-Lim) in c. 1796 BC, and installing his son Yasmah-Adad on its throne. Shamshi-Adad then concluded an alliance with Yamhad's rival to south Qatna, by marrying his son Yashmah-Adad to princess Beltum, the daughter of Ishi-Addu, king of Qatna.

Sumu-Epuh welcomed Zimri-Lim the heir of Mari who fled to Yamhad, in hope that he might be useful some day since in the eyes of the people of Mari, Zimri-Lim was the legitimate king. Shamshi-Adad's coalition attacked Aleppo but failed to take the city. Sumu-Epuh allied himself with the tribes of the Suteans and the Turukkaeans, who attacked the Assyrian king from the east and the south. Sumu-Epuh also conquered the Assyrian fortress Dur-Shamshi-Adad and renamed it Dur-Sumu-Epuh.

Death and legacy
Sumu-Epuh apparently was killed in c. 1780 BC during his fight with Shamshi-Adad, His successor was Yarim-Lim I, his son by his queen Sumunna-Abi. The dynasty of Sumu-Epuh continued to hold power in the Levant until c. 1344 BC.

References

Citations

19th-century BC births
18th-century BC deaths
19th-century BC rulers
18th-century BC rulers
19th-century BC people
18th-century BC people
Kings of Yamhad
People from Aleppo
Amorite kings
Yamhad dynasty
Monarchs killed in action